The Eclipse Award for Outstanding Trainer is an American Thoroughbred horse racing honor for trainers. Created in 1971, it is part of the Eclipse Awards program and is awarded annually.

Its Canadian counterpart is the Sovereign Award for Outstanding Trainer.

Records
Most wins:
 8 - Todd Pletcher (2004, 2005, 2006, 2007, 2010, 2013, 2014, 2022)
 5 - Robert J. Frankel (1993, 2000, 2001, 2002, 2003)
 4 - Laz Barrera (1976, 1977, 1978, 1979)
 4 - D. Wayne Lukas (1985, 1986, 1987, 1994)
 4 - Bob Baffert (1997, 1998, 1999, 2015)
 4 - Chad C. Brown (2016, 2017, 2018, 2019)

Past winners:

 1971 : Charlie Whittingham
 1972 : Lucien Laurin
 1973 : H. Allen Jerkens
 1974 : Sherrill W. Ward
 1975 : Stephen A. DiMauro
 1976 : Laz Barrera
 1977 : Laz Barrera
 1978 : Laz Barrera
 1979 : Laz Barrera
 1980 : Bud Delp
 1981 : Ron McAnally
 1982 : Charlie Whittingham
 1983 : Woody Stephens
 1984 : Jack Van Berg
 1985 : D. Wayne Lukas
 1986 : D. Wayne Lukas
 1987 : D. Wayne Lukas
 1988 : Claude R. McGaughey III
 1989 : Charlie Whittingham
 1990 : Carl Nafzger
 1991 : Ron McAnally
 1992 : Ron McAnally
 1993 : Robert J. Frankel
 1994 : D. Wayne Lukas
 1995 : William I. Mott
 1996 : William I. Mott
 1997 : Bob Baffert
 1998 : Bob Baffert
 1999 : Bob Baffert
 2000 : Robert J. Frankel
 2001 : Robert J. Frankel
 2002 : Robert J. Frankel
 2003 : Robert J. Frankel
 2004 : Todd Pletcher
 2005 : Todd Pletcher
 2006 : Todd Pletcher
 2007 : Todd Pletcher
 2008 : Steve Asmussen
 2009 : Steve Asmussen
 2010 : Todd Pletcher
 2011 : William I. Mott
 2012 : Dale Romans
 2013 : Todd Pletcher
 2014 : Todd Pletcher
 2015 : Bob Baffert
 2016 : Chad C. Brown
 2017 : Chad C. Brown
 2018 : Chad C. Brown
 2019 : Chad C. Brown
 2020 : Brad H. Cox
 2021 : Brad H. Cox
 2022 : Todd Pletcher

References
 The Eclipse Awards at the Thoroughbred Racing Associations of America, Inc.
 The Bloodhorse.com Champion's history charts

American horse trainers
American horse racing awards
Horse racing awards
Horse racing in the United States